Mike Moffat may refer to:

Mike Moffatt, Canadian economist and economics writer
 Mike Moffat (luger) (born 1982), Canadian luger
 Mike Moffat (ice hockey) (born 1962), Canada ice hockey goaltender

See also
Michael Moffat, Scottish footballer